The National Novel Award (Premio Nacional de Novela) is one of the main literary awards given annually in Bolivia. It is convened by the Ministry of Cultures, and originally sponsored by Grupo Santillana, through the Alfaguara publishing house. It was established in 1998 to promote the dissemination of Bolivian literature in the novel genre and better awareness of its authors.

All persons of Bolivian nationality who reside in the country, excluding authors awarded the previous two years, authorities, public officials, and Santillana employees, can qualify for the award. A jury composed of prominent members of the Bolivian and international literary and cultural world selects the winner.

In practice, it replaced the Erich Guttentag Award, which was organized by Los Amigos del Libro publishing house. Honorable mentions have been granted in some years.

In 2012, the prize was 89,300 bolivianos. Of the total sum, the Ministry of Cultures contributed 22,800 Bs., the Embassy of Spain 21,000, Banco Sol 21,000, BBA Previsión AFP 10,500, Red ATB 7,000, and Grupo Santilllana with the same amount.

Winners

References

1998 establishments in South America
Awards established in 1998
Bolivian awards
Bolivian literature
South American literary awards
Spanish-language literary awards